Euxesta galapagensis is a species of ulidiid or picture-winged fly in the genus Euxesta of the family Ulidiidae. It was described by Charles Howard Curran in 1934. It is endemic to Galápagos Islands.

References

galapagensis
Insects described in 1934
Taxa named by Charles Howard Curran
Endemic fauna of the Galápagos Islands